"Last Contact" is a 4347-word science fiction short story published in 2007 by Stephen Baxter.  It was nominated for the 2008 Hugo Award for Best Short Story.

Plot
A mother and daughter, Maureen and 35-year-old Caitlin, live through the last few months of Earth's existence. Maureen and her late husband Harry are described as having substantial astrophysical intelligence. Caitlin, an astrophysicist herself, has been involved with the recent discovery of the Big Rip, a field of dark energy that is essentially tearing the universe apart. With distant galaxies disappearing from view in deep field images, scientists have determined that the effect will culminate in a matter of months, unbeknownst to the general public. On March 15, Caitlin participated in a BBC Radio 4 discussion about the discovery, revealing it to the public.

On June 5, amid their search for extraterrestrial intelligence as part of the Rip, distinctly shaped signals were detected, possibly caused by phantom energy. Caitlin reveals that she was invited to a shelter made by the University of Oxford which can make humans potentially outlive Earth using special equipment.

The morning of October 14, the Sun gradually darkens within minutes. Maureen joins Caitlin in their pergola. Caitlin reveals that earlier, she, Bill, and the kids celebrated Christmas early; after the lunch, Bill put blue pills that had been distributed to everyone by the National Health Service in the kids' respective lemonades, and they fell asleep. Bill then took his own pill, and allowed Caitlin to leave, as she "always wanted to see it through to the end." She also declined the Oxford invitation. She gives Maureen a silicon sphere with instruments inside; Maureen is instructed to "keep recording until the expansion [of the universe] gets down to the centimeter scale, and the Rip cracks the sphere open, [then] the expansion reaches molecular scales", all of which should take a microsecond. They embrace as an earthquake reigns. Suddenly, Caitlin asks regarding interstellar messages Maureen claimed redundant to be decoded. As a violent wind blows, Maureen again replies that they do not need to be decoded – it is obvious to her the messages must have been variations of "goodbye".

References

External links
Full story at Solaris Books

Science fiction short stories
2007 short stories
End of the universe in fiction